Stillingia bicarpellaris is a species of flowering plant in the family Euphorbiaceae. It was described by Sereno Watson in 1886. It is native to northeastern Mexico.

References

bicarpellaris
Plants described in 1886
Flora of Mexico
Taxa named by Sereno Watson